Breeding of Mind is an album by American jazz guitarist O'Donel Levy recorded in 1972 and released on the Groove Merchant label.

Reception 

Allmusic's Jason Ankeny said: "Breeding of Mind pairs guitarist O'Donel Levy with arranger Manny Albam for a genre-defying set that embraces elements of jazz, funk and baroque pop -- the end result is soulful and sublime, couching Levy's uncommonly expressive tone in a series of bold, lush contexts that underline the sophistication of his craft".

Track listing
All compositions by O'Donel Levy except where noted
 "We've Only Just Begun" (Roger Nichols, Paul Williams) – 3:57
 "It's Too Late" (Carole King, Toni Stern) – 3:35
 "Breeding of Mind" – 3:14
 "Cherries" – 4:04
 "On Broadway" (Barry Mann, Cynthia Weil, Jerry Leiber, Mike Stoller) – 3:37
 "Ideal" – 4:01
 "Never Can Say Goodbye" (Clifton Davis) – 5:18
 "Let's Stay Together" (Al Green, Willie Mitchell, Al Jackson Jr.) – 3:09
 "The Chocolate Horse" – 3:17
 "Angel Eyes" (Matt Dennis, Earl Brent) – 4:29

Personnel
O'Donel Levy – guitar
Charles Covington – organ
Eric Ward – bass
Chester Thompson – drums
Manny Albam – arranger, conductor (tracks 1-4)
Burt Collins, Joe Shepley – flugelhorn (tracks 1-4)
David Nadien, Selwart Clarke, Gene Orloff, Paul Gershman, Joe Malin, Alfred Brown, Emanuel Green – violin (tracks 1-4)
Kermit Moore, George Ricci, Charles McCracken – cello (tracks 1-4)

References

Groove Merchant albums
O'Donel Levy albums
1972 albums
Albums produced by Sonny Lester
Albums arranged by Manny Albam
Albums conducted by Manny Albam